The Fort Worth Zoo is a zoo in Fort Worth, Texas, United States, that was founded in 1909 with one lion, two bear cubs, an alligator, a coyote, a peacock and a few rabbits.  The zoo now is home to 7,000 native and exotic animals and has been named as a top zoo in the nation by Family Life magazine, the Los Angeles Times and USA Today, as well as one of the top zoos in the South by Southern Living Reader's Choice Awards.

The Fort Worth Zoo is accredited by both the Association of Zoos and Aquariums (AZA) and Zoological Association of America (ZAA), and is a member of the World Association of Zoos and Aquariums (WAZA).

History 

When the Fort Worth Zoo opened in 1909, it had one African lion, two bear cubs, an alligator, a coyote, a peacock and a few rabbits. From its opening until 1991, the zoo was owned and operated by the City of Fort Worth. Although the city collected money from the community to purchase new animals, the Zoological society (now the Fort Worth Zoological Association) was formed in 1939 to help raise additional funds.

Monkey Island was built in 1937 with funds from the Works Progress Administration. After being refurbished in 1949, this exhibit became a sea lion pool, and by 1970, it had been converted to house small South American mammals. Storks and cranes were housed in this exhibit in the 1980s, and it was converted once again in the early 1990s to house alligators. It is currently being used as the Parrot Paradise exhibit.

Boasting the largest exhibit of reptiles and amphibians in the world (with 175 vivaria and about 200 species), the facility also included a zoo hospital and quarantine room. Features such as refrigerated air, operational skylights, temperature controlled water, switch operated emergency alarms, and state-of-the-art service facilities, made the Herpetarium a marvel of technology for its time. Innovative exhibits such as a display of giant snakes with curved non-reflective glass (creating the illusion of an open-fronted exhibit) were especially popular attractions. The main public area included five exhibit halls covering various geographic regions and another area that was devoted exclusively to amphibians. There were also special exhibits teaching the identification of native venomous snakes and treatment for snakebite.

In October 1991, the Fort Worth Zoological Association assumed management of the zoo under a contract with the city. In 1992, the zoo opened the first two of a series of exhibits: World of Primates and Asian Falls. During the rest of the decade, the zoo opened Raptor Canyon, Asian Rhino Ridge, an education center in 1993, a cheetah exhibit in 1994, Flamingo Bay, a Komodo dragon exhibit, Insect City in 1995, Meerkat Mounds in 1997, a new veterinary center in 1998, and Thundering Plains (now closed) in 1999.

The first decade of the new millennium saw the opening of Texas Wild! in 2001 to showcase native Texas animals, Parrot Paradise in 2004, Great Barrier Reef in 2005 as part of a renovated Australian Outback exhibit, and the penguin exhibit in 2008. This decade also saw the closing of the original Herpetarium in 2009 to be replaced by the  Museum of Living Art in 2010.

Future 
In the autumn of 2016, the zoo announced its $100-million capital campaign: A Wilder Vision, which will include new exhibit space, renovated habitats, special events space, multiple dining areas, restrooms and most importantly, new ways to observe, interact with and learn about animals. The first step in this plan, a renovated African Savanna, opened in April 2018. The second step in this plan, an expanded elephant exhibit, opened in April 2021. The other upcoming projects are renovated exhibits for the various African and Asian carnivores, and a new Forests & Jungles section. Species will include the clouded leopard, African wild dog, Malayan tiger, African Lion, Cheetah, Striped hyena, Nubian ibex, Plains zebra, and an African leopard for the African and Asian Predators section, with plans to open this area in the Spring of 2023. The okapi is the very first announced new species for the Forests & Jungles section, with a relocation of the Sumatran orangutans and the Bongo to this area. The planned opening date for the Forests & Jungles section is Spring of 2025.

Main exhibits 

Current zoo exhibits include Penguins, World of Primates, the Brand New Elephant Springs, Raptor Canyon, Flamingo Bay, Elephant Springs, Australian Outback, African Savanna, Parrot Paradise, Texas Wild! and the Museum of Living Art (MOLA).

Penguins

This indoor exhibit is home to a colony of African penguins and an indoor enclosure for southern rockhopper penguins and common eider, both include a beach and an underwater viewing area.

World of Primates

Opened in 1992, World of Primates is a  exhibit that includes both indoor and outdoor habitats. The atrium is a tropical rainforest that has since been turned into an aviary, in which visitors can observe several different bird species from around the world and mantled guerezas. Once through the atrium, visitors take a winding boardwalk past other primates including the zoo's western lowland gorilla troop, Sumatran orangutans, mandrills, bonobos, and Northern white-cheeked gibbons.

Elephant Springs

The all-new Elephant Springs was opened on April 15, 2021 (Originally opened in 1992 as half of the former Asian Falls) and includes a huge remodeled Asian elephant yard complex. Before getting to the elephants, visitors can go past the entrance and either go to the River Village or check out a viewing area that gives a better view of the Indian Peafowl and the Indian rhinoceros. The exhibit also features a Demonstration Area for an elephant encounter show.

 Raptor Canyon

Raptor Canyon is an aviary that opened in 1993 and is home to crowned eagles, Andean condors, king vultures, harpy eagles, white-backed vultures, and palm-nut vultures.

 Flamingo Bay

Flamingo Bay is home to the 70 or so flamingos at the zoo. The exhibit includes three species of flamingo, including American flamingoes, Chilean flamingoes, and lesser flamingoes, with the all three, as well the zoo's greater flamingos, being successfully bred.

Australian Outback/Great Barrier Reef

The exhibit includes 500 animals representing 86 species, including clownfish, angelfish, brain corals, stingrays and sea apples.

African Savanna

Opened in 2018, the newly renovated African Savanna allows guests to see reticulated giraffes, lesser kudu, springbok, Bongo, ostriches, Abyssinian ground hornbills, Cape vulture, pink-backed pelicans & helmeted guineafowl from multiple viewing spots, including an elevated boardwalk that allows giraffe feeding. There are also several paddocks for southern black rhinos, an above and underwater viewing area of the hippopotamus, a greater flamingo pond, the zoo's meerkat mob and an aviary.

Parrot Paradise

Parrot Paradise was opened on the zoo's upper path between the lions and Raptor Canyon in 2004. It is a free-flight aviary featuring rosellas, macaws, cockatiels and budgerigars.

Texas Wild!

Texas Wild was opened in 2001 to display various animals native to Texas. This section includes a carousel with hand-painted ponies. Texas Town includes a play barn and the Texas Hall of Wonders, and prepares visitors for the rest of the exhibit. High Plains and Prairies represents the Panhandle and Northwestern Texas. It is home to swift foxes, greater roadrunners, burrowing owls, and black-tailed prairie dog, White-tailed deer, and Wild turkey Pineywoods and Swamps represents East Texas. This section of the exhibit includes red wolves, North American river otters, American alligators, and American black bears. Gulf Coast is home to Southern Texas animals including the aquatic animals and waterfowl of the delta marsh, and includes an aviary that is home to birds including the roseate spoonbill and American white pelicans and brown pelicans. Brush Country represents Southern Texas. This section includes bobcats, cougars, coyotes, jaguars, ocelots, ring-tailed cats, and white-nosed coati, as well as birds of prey which are the turkey vulture, red-tailed hawk, and bald eagle. Mountains and Desert is currently under construction, being remodeled into a new area focused on education and conservation. 

Museum of Living Art (MOLA)

The Museum of Living Art is a $19 million,  herpetarium built to replace the original herpetarium at the zoo. The facility houses more than 5,000 animals representing more than 100 species from across the world. Residents include a saltwater crocodile, Anegada rock iguana, Aldabra giant tortoises, a Burmese python, Pig-nosed turtles, golden lion tamarins, ring-tailed lemurs, gharials, a hellbender, and a king cobra. The zoo's Komodo dragons are located here as well.

Conservation

The Fort Worth Zoo administers the Arthur A. Seeligson Jr. Conservation Fund (SCF), which supports conservation of native wildlife within Texas through grants towards scientists, educators, organizations, and landowners who work to conserve the biodiversity of Texas. Money from this fund has gone towards multiple projects such as training search dogs to locate Houston toads, genetic assessments for ornate box turtle populations, and development for conservation strategies for alligator snapping turtles.

The zoo and their conservation biologists also host and are a part of many conservation projects, such as projects seeking to increase populations for the Anegada rock iguana, Panamanian golden frog, Louisiana pine snake, Texas kangaroo rat, and many more species.

The Fort Worth Zoo is partnered with multiple other conservation groups, such as the International Elephant Foundation, the International Rhino Foundation, the Turtle Survival Alliance, and multiple other conservation groups doing work in over 30 countries.

Art

The zoo features an unusual Texas sized sculpture.  A furious 40-foot iguana sculpture named Iggy,  was lowered by helicopter onto the roof of the animal hospital in June 2010. Created by Austin artist Bob "Daddy-O" Wade, the sculpture is owned by Fort Worth oilman Lee M. Bass.

Notes

External links

Zoos in Texas
Culture of Fort Worth, Texas
Economy of Fort Worth, Texas
Tourist attractions in Fort Worth, Texas
Buildings and structures in Fort Worth, Texas
Zoos established in 1909
1909 establishments in Texas